Xaver Affentranger (born 1 December 1897, date of death unknown) was a Swiss cross-country skier, Nordic combined skier, and ski jumper who competed in the 1920s.

At the 1924 Winter Olympics he finished 17th in the Nordic combined event, 22nd in the 18 km cross-country competition, and 24th in the ski jumping event.

He won a bronze medal in the Nordic combined at the 1925 FIS Nordic World Ski Championships in Johannisbad.

External links

profile at sports-reference.com

1897 births
Year of death missing
Swiss male Nordic combined skiers
Swiss male cross-country skiers
Swiss male ski jumpers
Olympic Nordic combined skiers of Switzerland
Olympic cross-country skiers of Switzerland
Olympic ski jumpers of Switzerland
Nordic combined skiers at the 1924 Winter Olympics
Cross-country skiers at the 1924 Winter Olympics
Ski jumpers at the 1924 Winter Olympics
FIS Nordic World Ski Championships medalists in Nordic combined